Alvin Rakoff (born Abraham Rakoff; February 6, 1927) is a Canadian director of film, television and theatre productions. He has worked with actors including Laurence Olivier, Peter Sellers, Sean Connery, Judi Dench, Rex Harrison, Rod Steiger, Henry Fonda and Ava Gardner.

He gave Sean Connery his first leading role when he was an unknown extra, and gave Alan Rickman his first job when he was a drama student. Other actors he worked with early in their careers include Michael Crawford, Jeremy Irons, and Michael Caine.

Early life
Rakoff's mother came from Rovno in Ukraine; his father was from Voronezh in Russia. His parents, secular Jews, met in Toronto, Ontario, Canada. He is the third of seven children. His parents had a shop in Kensington Market. After graduation from the University of Toronto, he became a journalist and began writing for Canadian Broadcasting Corporation's nascent television service. He was seconded by the CBC to visit "the country where TV first started - England". Days after arriving he sold a script to the British Broadcasting Corporation, at the time the only television broadcaster in the UK. The BBC subsequently invited him to join their television directors' training course. At 26 years of age, he became the youngest producer/director in the BBC drama department. He became a resident in the United Kingdom through working extensively worldwide.

When Rakoff was 16, he changed his first name from Abraham to Alvin, inspired by Alvin York and the film Sergeant York.

Career

A BBC adaptation in 1953 of the Irwin Shaw novel The Troubled Air was his first major writing assignment for television. In 1954, his production of Waiting For Gillian won the Daily Mails National TV Award with actors Patrick Barr and Anne Crawford also honored. He later recreated this production in French for transmission throughout France. In 1955, on the night commercial TV first appeared in the UK he was asked by the BBC to offer the main opposition, The Hole In The Wall with Mervyn Johns and Sidney Tafler, of which The Times wrote: "Mr. Rakoff who seems to be a master of this medium". 

In his 1957 production Requiem for a Heavyweight he lifted an unknown actor, Sean Connery, from the ranks of walk-ons and gave Connery his first leading role. Also in this production was another performer early in his career, Michael Caine. In 1958, Rakoff adapted, directed, and produced Herman Wouk's The Caine Mutiny Court Martial for the BBC.

In 1962, the BBC asked Rakoff to produce/direct its entry for the European-wide 'The Largest Theatre In The World' written especially for the occasion by Terence Rattigan and called Heart to Heart, with Kenneth More and Ralph Richardson. In 1964, when the new channel BBC 2 was launched Rakoff was selected to direct plays filling the first three Sunday-night drama slots (The Seekers). He won his first Emmy Award in 1967 for Call Me Daddy, which had featured Donald Pleasence, and 15 years later won it again for A Voyage Round My Father (Laurence Olivier, Alan Bates, and Jane Asher took the leads) which he produced and directed. 

His production of The Adventures of Don Quixote (1973) with Rex Harrison and Frank Finlay achieved international  praise. In his 1978 production of Romeo & Juliet for the BBC Television Shakespeare series he cast the then unknown actor Alan Rickman as Tybalt. In 1997 he produced and co-directed the award-winning A Dance to the Music of Time with John Gielgud, Simon Russell Beale, and Miranda Richardson.

His films include On Friday at Eleven (a.k.a. World in My Pocket in the U.S. starring Rod Steiger; Say Hello to Yesterday (1970), which he also wrote, featured Jean Simmons and Leonard Whiting; Hoffman starred Peter Sellers; City on Fire, which he co-wrote, starred Henry Fonda, Ava Gardner, and Shelley Winters.

Rakoff's writing includes Too Marvelous For Words, the story of lyricist Johnny Mercer presented at The Mill Theatre, Sonning, and King's Head Theatre, London. He has written three novels. His first, & Gillian, a romantic odyssey, was translated into 10 languages. His second, Baldwin Street, based on his early days in his parents' shop in Toronto, was published in 2008. The Seven Einsteins, a third novel, is a genetic thriller published in 2014. A successful adaptation of Raymond Chandler's The Big Sleep was produced in 2012. Currently, Rakoff is developing and writing An Act of Love for Orchard Films Ltd. 

His theatre work ranges from Hamlet at Bristol Old Vic to a Charity Cruise performance at the Royal Albert Hall before Her Majesty the Queen, and continues with his association with The Mill Theatre, Sonning, directing productions of Separate Tables with Anthony Valentine and his own adaptation of Chandler's The Big Sleep.

In 2010, Rakoff directed A Sentimental Journey, the story of Doris Day, at Wilton's Music Hall, London, and subsequently (2012) El Portal Theater, Hollywood.

He is a former president of the Directors Guild of Great Britain.

Filmography

Feature films (director)

Television (director)

Writing (television, films, books)

Theatre credits (director)
 1965 - Hamlet, Bristol Old Vic
	 (Richard Pasco, Barbara Leigh Hunt, Margaret Courtney, etc.)

 1982 - Celia Johnson Theatre fund, Aldwych Theatre
	 (Ralph Richardson, Jeremy Irons, Richard Briers, etc.)

 1984 - Cruise Charity, Albert Hall
	(Richard Briers, John Gielgud, Penelope Keith, Wayne Sleep, etc.)

 1995 – Stage Struck by Simon Gray, The Mill at Sonning
	(Nicholas Jones)

 2001-2002 – Too Marvelous For Words: The Story of Lyricist Johnny Mercer
	(written and directed) The Mill at Sonning

 2002 – Too Marvelous For Words, King's Head Theatre, London

 2004 – I Remember You by Bernard Slade, The Mill at Sonning

 2005 – Separate Tables by Terence Rattigan, The Mill at Sonning
	(Anthony Valentine, Glynis Barber)

 2007 – Same Time Next Year by Bernard Slade, The Mill at Sonning
	(Steven Pacey, Shona Lindsay)

 2009 – A Sentimental Journey, The Story of Doris Day. The Mill at Sonning
	(Sally Hughes, Glyn Kerslake)

 2010 – A Sentimental Journey, The Story of Doris Day. Wilton's, London

 2011 - The Big Sleep by Raymond Chandler. The world's first stage adaptation of the famous crime novel. Adapted with his son John D. Rakoff.

 2011 - A Sentimental Journey, The Story of Doris Day - Edinburgh Festival; The Mill at Sonning; El Portal Theater, Los Angeles.

References

External links
 

1927 births
Living people
Canadian television directors
Film directors from Toronto